Acropora gemmifera is a species of acroporid coral found in the Gulf of Aden, the Red Sea, the central Indo-Pacific, the southwest and northern Indian Ocean, southeastern Asia, Australia, the East China Sea, Japan, the oceanic central and western Pacific Ocean, and northwestern Hawaii. It occurs on exposed upper reef flats and slopes, from depths of 1–15 m. It was described by Brook in 1892.

Description
It occurs in digitate colonies consisting of thick tapering branches. Branches contain a single axial corallite on the end and the radial corallites are arranged in rows. Incipient axial corallites are located towards the bases of branches. It is blue, brown, cream or purple in colour and the branches have white or blue tips. The corallites are dark grey with white rims, and specimens in the Indian Ocean have been observed with yellowish axial corallites.

Distribution
It is classed as a least concern species on the IUCN Red List, but it is thought that its population is decreasing in line with global coral decline, and it is listed under Appendix II of CITES. Figures of its population are unknown, but is likely to be threatened by the global reduction of coral reefs, the increase of temperature causing coral bleaching, climate change, human activity, the crown-of-thorns starfish (Acanthaster planci) and disease. It occurs in the Gulf of Aden, the Red Sea, the central Indo-Pacific, the southwest and northern Indian Ocean, southeastern Asia, Australia, the East China Sea, Japan, the oceanic central and western Pacific Ocean, and northwestern Hawaii.

Taxonomy
It was described by Brook in 1892 as Madrepora gemmifera.

References

Acropora
Cnidarians of the Pacific Ocean
Marine fauna of Oceania
Least concern biota of Oceania
Corals described in 1892